Nanaimo Lakes are a chain of four lakes composed of three natural—First, Second, and Third Lakes—and one man-made, dammed lake, Fourth Lake, on the upper Nanaimo River, on Vancouver Island in British Columbia, Canada.

Geography
The lakes are in a highland transitional area between the southern Vancouver Island Ranges and the Nanaimo Lowland.

The 1:50,000 topographic map quadrangle , published by Natural Resources Canada, is centred on the lakes. Note that lake names do not appear on all online mapping services, and Third Lake, not listed by the Watershed Roundtable, but listed in a 1919 guide, and on the Natural Resources Canada map, may not appear on some maps at all. A lake with a dam at the north end, named "Fourth Lake", is also shown on the map. First Lake and Second Lake, at  210 metres above sea level, are connected by a short stream.  Fourth Lake Dam is privately owned and impounds  of water, used for a paper mill.

Third Lake , natural, much smaller than the others

Parks and recreation
Timberwest owns four campsites on private land surrounding First Lake. The lake was stocked with up to 30,000 salmon or trout per year for recreational fishing beginning in 1905 through the early 21st century. Fourth Lake can be kayaked.

Nanaimo Lakes fire balloon
In March, 1945, a Fu-Go balloon bomb made in Yamaguchi Prefecture and launched from Japan landed at the lakes. Its firing circuits malfunctioned; it failed to detonate and was recovered and analyzed by a Canadian–American intelligence effort.

See also
List of lakes of British Columbia

References

Sources
  Unpublished report prepared for the Nanaimo & Area Land Trust. 312 pp.

External links

Further reading
 

Lakes of Vancouver Island
Mid Vancouver Island
Nanaimo
Dunsmuir Land District